Andeli Beijie station is a station on Line 8 of the Beijing Subway. It was opened on December 26, 2015.

Station Layout 
The station has an underground island platform.

Exits 
There are 2 exits, lettered B and D. Exit B is accessible.

References

Railway stations in China opened in 2015
Beijing Subway stations in Dongcheng District